Charles Blayney Colmore (March 31, 1879 - June 28, 1950) was second bishop of the Episcopal Diocese of Puerto Rico.

Early life and education
Colmore was born on March 31, 1879, in Victoria, Tennessee, the son of Robert Lionel Colmore and Priscilla Diana Addenbrooke. He graduated with a Bachelor of Arts from Sewanee: The University of the South in 1898. In 1900 he earned his Master of Arts and in 1903 his Bachelor of Divinity. He was awarded a Doctor of Divinity in 1914.

Ordained Ministry
After studies at the University of the South, he was ordained deacon and priest in 1904. He served as rector of the Church of the Messiah in Pulaski, Tennessee till 1905 when he became Dean of the Cathedral of the Holy Trinity in Havana in Cuba, where he remained till 1913.

Bishop
Colmore was elected Bishop of Puerto Rico in 1913 and was consecrated to the episcopate on December 17, 1913, by Presiding Bishop Daniel S. Tuttle. He was also responsible for the Missionary district of the Dominican Republic for some time. He retired in 1947.

Family
Colmore married Sarah Rogers Palmer on November 18, 1903, and together had six children.

References 
Bishop Ward Dies, The Living Church, July 9, 1950, p. 5.

1879 births
1950 deaths
American Episcopalians
American expatriate bishops
Episcopal bishops of Puerto Rico